

172001–172100 

|-id=090
| 172090 Davidmccomas ||  || David J. McComas (born 1958), a Professor of Astrophysical Sciences at Princeton University, served as a Co-Investigator on the Particles and Plasma Science Team for the New Horizons mission to Pluto. || 
|}

172101–172200 

|-id=191
| 172191 Ralphmcnutt ||  || Ralph McNutt (born 1953) is a senior scientist at the Johns Hopkins University Applied Physics Laboratory. He served as a science team co-investigator and as the Principal Investigator of the PEPSSI instrument aboard the New Horizons mission to Pluto. || 
|}

172201–172300 

|-id=269
| 172269 Tator ||  || Michael Tator (1956–2009), German amateur astronomer and co-founder of Turtle Star Observatory in Muelheim-Ruhr || 
|}

172301–172400 

|-id=315
| 172315 Changqiaoxiaoxue ||  || Suzhou ChangQiao Primary School. It was founded in 1911 and is located in the historic town of Lishu, China. || 
|-id=317
| 172317 Walterbos ||  || René Walterbos (born 1957), Dutch–American astronomer with the Sloan Digital Sky Survey || 
|-id=318
| 172318 Wangshui ||  || Shu-i Wang (born 1964), American optical engineer with the Sloan Digital Sky Survey || 
|}

172401–172500 

|-id=425
| 172425 Taliajacobi ||  || Talia Jacobi (born 1977), Israeli medical student, nature guide and fan of astronomy, wife of the discoverer David Polishook || 
|-id=430
| 172430 Sergiofonti ||  || Sergio Fonti (1945–2018) was a planetary scientist and Professor at Lecce University. He worked on the Rosetta, Mars Express and Venus Express space missions. || 
|}

172501–172600 

|-id=505
| 172505 Kimberlyespy ||  || Kimberly Andrews Espy (born 1963) is the former Senior Vice President for Research at the University of Arizona, and was instrumental in establishing the space situational awareness initiative. A translational clinical neuroscientist and psychologist, she pioneered the integration of cognitive neuroscience tools. || 
|-id=525
| 172525 Adamblock ||  || Adam Block (born 1973), American astronomy popularizer, discoverer of minor planets and astronomical director of the Mount Lemmon Science Center || 
|-id=526
| 172526 Carolinegarcia ||  || Caroline M. Garcia (born 1961) is the Associate Vice President for Research at the University of Arizona. She has been instrumental in the administration of research resources at the university. An accountant by training, she has served the university for more than three decades. || 
|-id=593
| 172593 Vörösmarty || 2003 VM || Mihály Vörösmarty (1800–1855) was a poet and dramatist, one of the greatest Hungarian romanticists, and a full member of the Hungarian Academy of Science. His poetry Szózat became a second national anthem, and Csongor és Tünde is one of the best Hungarian plays of the nineteenth century. || 
|}

172601–172700 

|-bgcolor=#f2f2f2
| colspan=4 align=center | 
|}

172701–172800 

|-id=734
| 172734 Giansimon ||  || Gianluca (born 1969) and Simona (born 1971), sons of Italian co-discoverer Giancarlo Fagioli || 
|}

172801–172900 

|-id=850
| 172850 Coppens ||  || Yves Coppens (born 1934), French paleoanthropologist, codiscoverer of the Australopithecus afarensis Lucy || 
|}

172901–173000 

|-id=932
| 172932 Bachleitner || 2005 JC || Hannes Bachleitner (born 1965), a well-known Austrian amateur astronomer and astrophotographer || 
|-id=947
| 172947 Baeyens ||  || Dennis A. Baeyens (born 1946), is a molecular biologist who earned a PhD at Michigan State University. || 
|-id=951
| 172951 Mehoke ||  || Douglas S. Mehoke (born 1956) is a thermal engineer at the Johns Hopkins University Applied Physics Laboratory, and served as a Thermal Systems Engineer for the New Horizons mission to Pluto. || 
|-id=985
| 172985 Ericmelin ||  || Eric D. Melin (born 1977) is a software engineer at the Johns Hopkins University Applied Physics Laboratory, and served as the Ground Systems Lead for the New Horizons mission to Pluto. || 
|-id=989
| 172989 Xuliyang ||  || Xu Liyang (born 1989), a friend of Chinese co-discoverer Ye Quan-Zhi || 
|-id=996
| 172996 Stooke ||  || Philip John Stooke (born 1952), Canadian geographer, author of the International Atlas of Lunar Exploration || 
|}

References 

172001-173000